Cedar Hill, also known as Cress Farm, is a historic home and farm located near Buena Vista, Rockbridge County, Virginia. The Federal style dwelling was built about 1821.

It was listed on the National Register of Historic Places in 1994.

References

Houses on the National Register of Historic Places in Virginia
Federal architecture in Virginia
Houses completed in 1821
Houses in Rockbridge County, Virginia
National Register of Historic Places in Rockbridge County, Virginia